Leeland Road station is a Virginia Railway Express station located at 275 Leeland Road in Stafford, Virginia, although VRE states that its address is in Falmouth, Virginia. The station serves the Fredericksburg Line and shares the right-of-way with Amtrak's Northeast Regional, Silver Meteor, Silver Star, Palmetto, Auto Train, and Carolinian trains. However, no Amtrak trains stop here. The station is located next to the Leeland Station community, which was named after the VRE station. It is also next to Conway Elementary School.

References

External links 

Leeland Road VRE Station
 Station from Leeland Road from Google Maps Street View

Transportation in Stafford County, Virginia
Virginia Railway Express stations
Buildings and structures in Stafford County, Virginia
Railway stations in the United States opened in 1992
1992 establishments in Virginia